NCAA Football 2001 is a video game of the sports genre released in 2000 by EA Sports. Its cover athlete is former University of Alabama running back Shaun Alexander.

Reception

The game received favorable reviews according to the review aggregation website GameRankings.

Notes

References

External links
Official website

2000 video games
College football video games
Electronic Arts games
NCAA video games
North America-exclusive video games
PlayStation (console) games
PlayStation (console)-only games
Video games set in 2001
Video games developed in the United States
Multiplayer and single-player video games